"Demon High" is a song by American rapper Lil Uzi Vert, released on October 29, 2021. It is speculated to be the lead single from their upcoming mixtape The Pink Tape. Produced by Charlie Handsome, Rex Kudo, and Pro Logic, the song sees Lil Uzi Vert sing-rapping about a failed relationship.

Composition
"Demon High" is an emo rap and trap song, inspired by a pop-punk and new wave sound. In the song, Lil Uzi Vert expresses their distrust for women ("I feel the demons (Yeah), comin' out of me / I won't ignite the flame / These girls, they're all the same"), lamenting a failed relationship in particular ("She don't givе a damn about me, only care what money's worth"). In the second verse, they briefly boast their wealth ("Stayed on my grind like I'm Ryan Sheckler (Woah) / If you do me good, that's a fur, that's a pur-").

Music video
An accompanying music video was released on October 29, 2021, and sees Lil Uzi Vert involved in antics at a high school. They are dressed in a "simple black suit", while the others are wearing "spooky masks and makeup" in reference to Halloween. Lil Uzi Vert is seen running from a crowd, getting a tattoo, engaging a food fight, joining a synchronized dancing group, and "getting mischievous" with a girl in a bathroom.

Charts

References

2021 singles
2021 songs
Lil Uzi Vert songs
Songs written by Lil Uzi Vert
Atlantic Records singles
Pop-rap songs
American pop punk songs